William Edward O'Brien (March 11, 1923 – December 1, 2000) was an American football coach and official.  He was the seventh head football coach at the Southern Illinois University Carbondale, serving for three seasons, from 1952 to 1954, and compiling a record of 6–20. O'Brien was an official in the National Football League (NFL) for 18 seasons, from 1967 through 1983, officiating in Super Bowl X in 1976. He wore number 83 for the major part of his NFL career. He was also a professor at Southern Illinois University.

O'Brien was born on March 11, 1923, in Schulter, Oklahoma.  He graduated in 1941 from Zeigler High School in Zeigler, Illinois.  O'Brien served in the United States Marine Corps during World War II and the Korean War, retiring as a colonel in 1983.  He died on December 1, 2000, at Cardinal Health Care in Energy, Illinois, after battling Alzheimer's disease for 13 years.

Head coaching record

References

1923 births
2000 deaths
Southern Illinois Salukis baseball coaches
Southern Illinois Salukis baseball players
Southern Illinois Salukis football coaches
Southern Illinois Salukis football players
National Football League officials
Indiana University Bloomington alumni
United States Marine Corps personnel of World War II
United States Marine Corps personnel of the Korean War
United States Marine Corps officers
People from Okmulgee County, Oklahoma
People from Zeigler, Illinois
Players of American football from Illinois
Baseball players from Illinois
Neurological disease deaths in Illinois
Deaths from Alzheimer's disease
Military personnel from Illinois